Kahat or Kaht may refer to
Kaht, a village in Iran
Darb-e Kahat, a village in Iran
Kahat, an ancient city at the Tell Barri archaeological site in Syria
Roi Kahat (born 1992), Israeli football  midfielder